High Holborn is a street in Holborn and Farringdon Without, Central London, which forms a part of the A40 route from London to Fishguard. It starts in the west at the eastern end of St Giles High Street and runs past the Kingsway and Southampton Row, becoming Holborn at its eastern junction with Gray's Inn Road. The western stretch as far as Drury Lane, was formerly known as Broad Street. On High Holborn, traffic (including cycles and buses) flows one-way westbound from its junction with Drake Street to its western end, and flows both ways for the remainder. 

The nearest London Underground stations are Tottenham Court Road, Holborn, and Chancery Lane, all on the Central line which runs beneath High Holborn.

Landmarks along High Holborn include the Cittie of Yorke, at no. 22, and the Embassy of Cuba, at no. 167.

The street was a "Feature site" for introduction of the Camden bench.

High Holborn is the highest point in the City of London. At 22 metres (72 feet) above sea level, High Holborn is the lowest county top in England.

References

External links

 LondonTown.com information

Streets in the London Borough of Camden
Streets in the City of London
Holborn